Hawfields is an unincorporated community in Alamance County, North Carolina, United States.

Hawfields was first populated by Ulster Irish and Western African immigrants as early as the 17th century but a firm establishment was not achieved until 1740–1750 and was originally called "Haw Old Fields" by the settlers because of the Haw River which runs partially through Hawfields and neighboring Mebane. Haw River itself is named for the Sissipihaw Indians who settled in the entire county of Alamance which is named for a Sissipihaw word for the blue mud in the riverbed.

Hawfields is located on North Carolina Highway 119, southwest of Mebane. It is one of the oldest communities in Alamance County, being referenced in historical works on the Sissipahaw. It is the site of the oldest church in Alamance County, Hawfields Presbyterian Church, which is on the National Register of Historic Places. This church was the seat of Orange Presbytery, which was formed in 1770.

Notable people
 Alexander Mebane, member of the United States House of Representatives. The nearby city of Mebane is named after him.
 Thomas Samuel Ashe, member of the United States House of Representatives and Congress of the Confederate States

References

External links
 

Unincorporated communities in North Carolina
Unincorporated communities in Alamance County, North Carolina